Sonia Wolff Levitin (born August 18, 1934) is a German-American novelist, artist, producer. Levitin, a Holocaust survivor, has written over forty novels and picture books for young adults and children, as well as several theatrical plays and published essays on various topics for adults.

Her book Incident at Loring Groves (1988) won an Edgar Allan Poe Award.

Early life

Sonia Levitin was born on August 18, 1934, in Berlin, Nazi Germany. Being of Jewish descent, she managed to escape persecution by traveling with her mother and two sisters to Switzerland. Her father, a prominent clothing designer, escaped to New York City and then to Los Angeles where he would raise Sonia and her sisters. Levitin would later write several novels about struggling as an immigrant in the United States; these include: The Journey to America and Silver Days, a series about a family of German Jewish refugees who flee the horrors of the Holocaust.

Always an avid reader, Levitin attended the University of California, Berkeley in 1952 where she would meet her husband, Lloyd Levitin. The two married after one year. She then completed a degree in education from the University of Pennsylvania.

Career

Levitin began as a publicity columnist for several newspapers, but after her first novel Journey to America became an instant classic, she began to pick up traction as a professional novelist. Levitin wrote numerous novels for young adults that oftentimes featured semi-autobiographical characters. The most common theme of her writing include courageous main characters faced with difficult challenges, who must "take charge" in order to overcome these obstacles. Her books often describe historical events and tragedies, especially toward Jewish people.

Painter

Levitin is also noted as being a talented painter. Her artwork was displayed in June 2015 for the first time to the public. And the inaugural art show, which was curated by Los Angeles event producer Anthony Angelini, took place at Christofle on Melrose Place in Beverly Hills, CA and was attended by several of the Los Angeles elite. The show featured 10 of Levitin's expressionist paintings which were never-before-seen in the public arena.

Books

 Adam's War
 All the Cats in the World
 Annie's Promise
 Beyond Another Door
 Boom Town
 Clem's Chances
 The Cure
 Dream Freedom
 Escape from Egypt
 Evil Encounter
 The Fisherman and the Bird (written with Francis Livingston)
 The Golem and the Dragon Girl
 The Goodness Gene 
 Incident at Loring Groves
 Jason and the Money Tree
 Journey to America
 The Man Who Kept His Heart in a Bucket
 The Mark of Conte
 Nine for California
 Nobody Stole the Pie
 The No-Return Trail
 A Piece of Home
 Reigning Cats and Dogs
 The Return
 Rita, the Weekend Rat
 Roanoke: A Novel of the Lost Colony
 Room in the Heart
 A Season for Unicorns
 Silver Days
 The Singing Mountain
 A Single Speckled Egg
 Smile Like a Plastic Daisy
 A Sound to Remember
 Strange Relations
 Taking Charge
 Who Owns the Moon?
 The Year of Sweet Senior Insanity
 Yesterday's Child

Awards

Levitin has won several awards for her writing including:

Edgar Allan Poe Award
1971: National Jewish Book Award for Journey to America
1988: National Jewish Book Award for The Return
Association of Jewish Libraries Sydney Taylor Award
Jewish Book Council Best Juvenile FictionAmerican Library Association Best Book for Young AdultsSouthern California Council on Literature for Children and Young People, Distinguished Body of Work Award German Bishops’ Conference, Children’s Book PrizePEN Los Angeles Award for Young Adult fiction''

References

External links
Sonia Levitin's website

1934 births
Living people
20th-century American novelists
21st-century American novelists
American women novelists
American children's writers
Edgar Award winners
Jewish American novelists
American women essayists
American women children's writers
20th-century American women writers
21st-century American women writers
20th-century American essayists
21st-century American essayists
21st-century American Jews